The Agricultural University of Plovdiv is a university in Plovdiv, Bulgaria

History
The Agricultural University of Plovdiv was founded in 1945 in the city of Plovdiv, Bulgaria.  It has strengthened its positions as a national centre of agricultural science and education in Bulgaria.

In 2006 the National Evaluation and Accreditation Agency awarded the Agricultural University – Plovdiv with an institutional accreditation and the highest grade of “Very Good”. The Institution provides training for three academic degrees – Bachelor, Master and PhD.  Foreign applicants who have completed the Preparatory training in Bulgarian language may study in Plovdiv.

The University has the faculties:
 Faculty of Agriculture
 Faculty of Horticulture and Wine
 Faculty of Crop Protection and Agroecology
 Faculty of Economics
 As well as the departments for language training, physical education and sports technology

The University is a member of the Balkan Universities Network, which includes select universities in Albania, Bosnia-Herzegovina, Bulgaria, Greece, Kosovo, Croatia, Romania, Serbia, Slovenia, Turkey, North Macedonia, Moldova, and Montenegro.

References

External links
Webpage of the Agricultural University of Plovdiv

Agricultural universities and colleges
Universities in Blagoevgrad
Educational institutions established in 1946
1946 establishments in Bulgaria